HC Prievidza is an ice hockey team playing in the Slovak 2. Liga, and formed in 1954. They play in the city of Prievidza, Slovakia at Zimný štadión Prievidza.

Honours

Domestic

Slovak 1. Liga
  Runners-up (1): 2003–04

Club names
 Baník Prievidza (1954–1975)
 TJ Banské Stavby Prievidza (1975–1998)
 Polygon Prievidza (1998–2000)
 HC Prievidza (2000–2002)
 MšHK Prievidza (2002–2010)
 HC Prievidza (2010–2014)
 MšHK Bulldogs Prievidza (2014–2015)
 HC Prievidza (2015–present)

References

External links
Official website  (Slovak)
 

Prievidza
Prievidza District
Sport in Trenčín Region
Ice hockey teams in Czechoslovakia
Ice hockey clubs established in 1954
1954 establishments in Czechoslovakia